Dalilah Muhammad (born February 7, 1990) is an American track and field athlete who specializes in the 400 meters hurdles. She is the 2016 Rio Olympics champion and 2020 Tokyo Olympics silver medalist, becoming at the latter the second-fastest woman of all time in the event with her personal best of 51.58 seconds. Muhammad was second at both the 2013 and 2017 World Championships to take her first gold in 2019, setting the former world record of 52.16 s. She was the second female 400 m hurdler in history, after Sally Gunnell, to have won the Olympic, World titles and broken the world record. At both the 2019 World Championships and Tokyo Games, she also took gold as part of women's 4×400 metres relay team.

Muhammad won the 400 m hurdles at the 2007 World Youth Championships, and placed second in the event at the 2009 Pan American Junior Championships. Collegiately, she ran for the USC Trojans, for whom she was a four-time All-American at the NCAA Outdoor Championships. She was also the 2013, 2016, and 2017 American national champion and a two-time Diamond League winner.

Early life
Dalilah Muhammad was born February 7, 1990, in Jamaica, Queens, New York City, to parents Nadirah and Askia Muhammad.

Athletic career

High school and college track
Dalilah Muhammad competed in various track and field events at high school, including the hurdles, sprints, and high jump. While at Benjamin N. Cardozo High School in Bayside, Queens, she won the 2008 New York State and Nike Outdoor Nationals titles in the 400 m hurdles. During that period, she also gained her first international experience. At the 2007 World Youth Championships in Athletics, she took the 400 m hurdles gold medal. Muhammad earned 2007 Gatorade Female Athlete of the Year for New York State.

In 2008, she enrolled at the University of Southern California on a sports scholarship, majoring in business. Joining the USC Trojans track team, she competed extensively in her first season. At the Pacific-10 Conference meet, she was runner-up in the 400 m hurdles, fourth in the 4×400-meter relay, and also set a personal record of 13.79 seconds as a finalist in the 100-meter hurdles. The NCAA Outdoor Championship saw her set a 400 m hurdles best of 56.49 seconds and finish in third place in the final. She won the national junior title that year and was the silver medallist at the 2009 Pan American Junior Athletics Championships. In her second year at USC, she was a runner-up at the Pac-10 championships but narrowly missed out on the NCAA final. The 2011 outdoor season saw her repeat her Pac-10-second place, and a personal record of 56.04 seconds in the NCAA semi-finals led to a sixth-place finish in the 400 m hurdles final.

In 2012, she set personal records in the sprint hurdles events, running 8.23 seconds for the 60-meter hurdles and 13.33 seconds for the 100 m hurdles. She ranked fifth in the latter event at the Pac-12 meet, where she placed third in the 400 m hurdles. She was again an NCAA finalist in her speciality, coming in fifth, and she also participated in the heats at the 2012 United States Olympic Trials. She ended her career as a USC Trojan athlete as the school's third fastest ever 400 m hurdler and a four-time NCAA All-American.

Professional
After graduating from USC, she chose to compete professionally in the 400 m hurdles. She improved her personal best in the 2013 season with 55.97 then 54.94 seconds in California. In her IAAF Diamond League debut, she placed fourth at the Shanghai Golden Grand Prix with a time of 54.74 seconds. She won at the Memorial Primo Nebiolo in Italy in 54.66, then she placed third at the Bislett Games in Norway with a run of 54.33 seconds.

At the 2013 USA Outdoor Track and Field Championships, she improved her personal record by half a second with a run of 53.83 in the final to win her first national title in the 400 m hurdles. Muhammad has represented Nike since 2013. At the 2014 USA Outdoor Track and Field Championships, Muhammad qualified for the 400 m hurdles but did not start. At the 2015 USA Outdoor Track and Field Championships, she placed 7th with a time of 57.31.

At the 2016 United States Olympic Trials, she won the 400-meter hurdles in 52.88. At the 2016 Summer Olympics, she won gold in the event, making her the first American woman to ever win gold in the 400-meter hurdles. The following year, she won the 2017 USA Outdoor Track and Field Championships with new personal best of 52.64. Muhammad went on to compete at the 2017 World Championships, and came away with a silver medal. She also won the 2017 and 2018 Diamond League titles in her event.

Muhammad broke the 400-meter hurdles world record at the 2019 USA Outdoor Track and Field Championships with a time of 52.20 seconds, improving Yuliya Pechonkina's 16-year-old record of 52.34 (2003). Muhammad was only the second woman in the history of the 400m hurdles, after Sally Gunnell, to have won the Olympic title and broken the world record. In September, the IAAF ratified Muhammad's time as the official world record. She won the gold medal at the 2019 World Championships, improving her time by 0.04 seconds, setting the new world record with a time of 52.16 seconds. At the end of the season she was selected for the Jackie Joyner-Kersee Award by the U.S.A. Track and Field Federation and by Track and Field News at its World Women's Athlete of the Year, voted their first choice by 24 of the publication's 36-member panel.

Track statistics

Information from World Athletics profile unless otherwise noted.

Personal bests

International championships

400 m hurdles circuit wins and titles
 Diamond League champion (2):  2017,  2018.
 2016: London, Lausanne
 2017: Brussels
 2018: Shanghai, Oslo, Zürich
 2019: Doha, Rome
 2021: Eugene
 2022: Birmingham

National championships

NCAA results from Track & Field Results Reporting System.

See also
 Muslim women in sport

Notes

References

External links

 

1990 births
Living people
American female hurdlers
African-American female track and field athletes
African-American Muslims
21st-century Muslims
Athletes (track and field) at the 2016 Summer Olympics
Athletes (track and field) at the 2020 Summer Olympics
Benjamin N. Cardozo High School alumni
Diamond League winners
Medalists at the 2016 Summer Olympics
Medalists at the 2020 Summer Olympics
Olympic female hurdlers
Olympic gold medalists for the United States in track and field
Olympic silver medalists for the United States in track and field
People from Jamaica, Queens
Sportspeople from Queens, New York
Track & Field News Athlete of the Year winners
Track and field athletes from New York City
USA Outdoor Track and Field Championships winners
USC Trojans women's track and field athletes
World Athletics Championships athletes for the United States
World Athletics Championships medalists
World Athletics Championships winners
21st-century African-American sportspeople
21st-century African-American women